Castigloine del Genovesi is a town and comune in the province of Salerno in the Campania region of south-western Italy.

Until 1862 it was known simply as Castiglione. It takes its current name from the philosopher and economist Antonio Genovesi, who was born here in 1713.
 
Located on the hillside below the Monte Monna, part of the Monti Picentini Regional Park, Castiglione borders with the municipalities of Baronissi, Fisciano, Giffoni Sei Casali, Salerno, San Cipriano Picentino and San Mango Piemonte.

References

External links

 Official website 

Cities and towns in Campania